The R-390A /URR is a general coverage HF radio communications receiver designed by Collins Radio Company for the United States Armed Forces.

History
The R-390A military shortwave radio receiver was the result of a project undertaken by the United States Army Signal Corps in 1954 to replace the existing R-390 receiver then in use. The R-390 had done its job so well that the Corps decided continued use of this type of receiver necessitated an improved, reduced-cost version. There are many references to the R390A in the open literature during this period; a picture of the receiver appeared in the May 1959 issue of QST.

The total production of the R-390A (as determined by the high serial numbers noted) is over 55,000 units. Initial production started in 1955 and ran through approximately 1970, and then was restarted in 1984 by Fowler Industries for Avondale Shipyards. Manufacturers and their approximate production numbers are:

Companies which made spare modules, but not whole sets were Communications Systems Corp., Clavier Corp. and Hacking Labs.

Design
The R-390A is a general coverage radio receiver capable of receiving amplitude modulated, code, and frequency shift keying signals. The circuit is the superheterodyne type, double conversion above , below which triple conversion is used. It employs 23 vacuum tubes, a larger than normal count for most general-coverage receivers.

The receiver weighs  and can be operated on 120-volt or 240-volt supplies. It fits neatly into a  standard 19-inch rack.
Tuning of the R-390A's radio frequency and intermediate frequency front end is synchronized by means of an ingenious mechanical system of racks, gears, and cams. When the front panel tuning controls are rotated, this system raises and lowers ferrite slugs in and out of the receiver's tuning coils. This ensures that all front-end circuits are tracked, meaning all circuits are tuned to the correct frequency to maintain excellent selectivity and sensitivity. The receiver's construction is modular for easy servicing. Each major area of the receiver is contained in easily removable subassemblies, and these can be repaired or replaced as needs be. Though the R-390A is mechanically and electrically complex, alignment and servicing were designed to follow simplified procedures published by the Signal Corps.

Use
The R-390A was deployed to most branches of the US military and remained in general use through the 1980s. The last major update to its documentation was in 1984. As the military procured newer receivers, many R-390As were released to surplus while others were destroyed. Some receivers were retained by the services, however, when they found that the R-390A's vacuum tube circuitry could easily survive an electromagnetic pulse. There are reports, possibly apocryphal, that R-390A receivers are still in use aboard U.S. Navy submarines since the receiver can withstand the strong radio frequency fields found aboard ship.

Many of the R-390As that exist today are in the hands of vintage amateur radio collectors and amateur radio operators who contend that few modern solid state communications receivers can equal its performance. There is a wealth of information, both printed and electronic, devoted to R-390A restoration and maintenance, as the R-390A is widely considered an example of the best of vacuum tube technology.

See also
ART 13 transmitter
ARC-5
BC-348
BC-654
Collins Radio
Hammarlund super pro
National HRO
Vintage amateur radio
75A-4 and KWS-1

References

Further reading

External links

Amateur radio receivers
Military radio systems of the United States
Military electronics of the United States
Equipment of the United States Air Force
Models of radios
Telecommunications equipment
Military equipment introduced in the 1950s